San Javier Municipality is a municipality of the Beni Department, Bolivia.

References 

  Instituto Nacional de Estadistica de Bolivia  (INE)

Municipalities of Beni Department